The 1986 Uruguayan Primera División was the 87th season of the league since its founding. It was contested by 13 teams, with Peñarol winning their 29th title.

League standings

Championship playoff

References
Uruguay - List of final tables (RSSSF)

Uruguayan Primera División seasons
1
Uru